Milan Marić may refer to:

 Milan Marić (actor, born 1981), Serbian actor
 Milan Marić (actor, born 1990), Serbian actor